The 2016 Asian Airgun Championships were held at Azadi Sport Complex, Tehran, Iran between 3 and 9 December 2016.

Medal summary

Men

Women

Medal table

References 
General
 ISSF Results Overview

Specific

External links 
 Official Results

Asian Shooting Championships
Asian
Shooting
2016 in Iranian sport
Shooting competitions in Iran